726 Joëlla is a minor planet orbiting the Sun. It was discovered on November 22, 1911, by Joel Hastings Metcalf, in Winchester, Massachusetts, in the United States.

References

External links
 
 

Background asteroids
Joella
19111122
Joella